Microeurydemus africanus is a species of leaf beetle. It is distributed in the Central African Republic, the Democratic Republic of the Congo, Saudi Arabia, Yemen, Eritrea and Sudan. It was first described by Martin Jacoby in 1900.

References

Eumolpinae
Beetles of Africa
Beetles of Asia
Beetles of the Democratic Republic of the Congo
Insects of the Central African Republic
Insects of the Arabian Peninsula
Insects of Eritrea
Insects of Sudan
Taxa named by Martin Jacoby
Beetles described in 1900